The Ballroom Overhang is a large limestone outcrop on the Fox River in Paparoa National Park, in the Buller District of New Zealand. The Ballroom Overhang provides a sheltered place for resting or overnight camping.

In suitable conditions, the  hike to the Ballroom Overhang and back can be made as return day trip from the coast road. However, it involves multiple river crossings, and these are likely to be impassable during or after heavy rain. The route to the Ballroom Overhang is classified as an advanced tramping track by the Department of Conservation. This part of the route requires several river crossings.

References

External links

 Ballroom Overhang at Wildernessmag.co.nz
 Ballroom Overhang video by Weka Films

Buller District
Rock formations of New Zealand
Landforms of the West Coast, New Zealand
Tourist attractions in the West Coast, New Zealand
Paparoa National Park